Ablabesmyia monilis is a Palearctic   species of Chironomidae described by Carl Linnaeus, in 1758. No sub-species mentioned in Catalogue of Life. It is found over all of Europe

References 

Tanypodinae
Flies described in 1758
Taxa named by Carl Linnaeus